One of a Kind is a 2013 French drama film directed by François Dupeyron. In January 2014 Grégory Gadebois received a nomination for Best Actor at the 39th César Awards.

Plot
Frédi is a born healer who can save people by touching them with his hands. His mother bequeathed this gift to him. When she dies honours her by putting his aptitude to good use.

Cast
 Grégory Gadebois as Frédi
 Céline Sallette as Nina
 Jean-Pierre Darroussin as The father
 Marie Payen as Josiane
 Philippe Rebbot as Nanar
 Nathalie Boutefeu as The leukemic mother

References

External links
 

2013 films
2013 drama films
Films directed by François Dupeyron
French drama films
2010s French-language films
Films based on French novels
Films produced by Paulo Branco
2010s French films